Hamzian or Hamziyan may refer to:
 Hamziyan, Markazi
 Hamzian-e Olya, West Azerbaijan Province
 Hamzian-e Sofla, West Azerbaijan Province